Lepakshi Handicrafts is a unit of Andhra Pradesh Handicrafts Development Corporation Ltd. which is an agency of Government of Andhra Pradesh established in 1982 to develop, preserve and promote the rich tradition of exquisite craftsmanship of Andhra Pradesh.

History 
Lepakshi Handicrafts was set up in the year 1982 for the promotion, development and marketing of handicrafts. It also undertake welfare activities for the benefit of the artisans.

Products
Kondapalli toys, Kalamkari paintings, Bobbili veena, Etikoppaka toys, Leather puppets and Wood works.

References 

State agencies of Andhra Pradesh
Culture of Andhra Pradesh
State handicrafts development corporations of India
1982 establishments in Andhra Pradesh
Companies based in Vijayawada
Government agencies established in 1982